Dodge City Trail is a 1936 American Western film directed by Charles C. Coleman. It stars Charles Starrett, Donald Grayson, and Marion Weldon.

References

External links
Dodge City Trail at the Internet Movie Database

1936 films
American Western (genre) films
1936 Western (genre) films
Films directed by Charles C. Coleman
American black-and-white films
Columbia Pictures films
1930s American films
1930s English-language films